Youghal railway station served the town of Youghal in County Cork, Ireland.

History

The station opened on 21 May 1860. Regular passenger services were withdrawn on 2 February 1963

The line was closed to all goods traffic except wagonload on 2 December 1974, closed to wagonload traffic except beet on 2 June 1978 and to beet traffic on 30 August 1982.

CIÉ also ran summer seaside excursions to Youghal for passengers.

The line has never been legally closed.  The last train to depart from the seaside station was in 1987 by the Irish Railway Record Society.  The following year Iarnród Éireann laid on two passenger trains from Midleton railway station for the Gaelic Athletic Association in Dublin.

The line was then abandoned. Since 1988 Iarnród Éireann has showed little or no interest in the line. In 1992 seven miles of track between Midleton and Youghal were removed for reuse in Sligo.

Youghal railway station has been re-roofed more recently.

Routes

References

External links
Irish Rail - Projects - Glounthaune to Midleton Railway Official site providing news on its re-opening.

Buildings and structures in Youghal
Disused railway stations in County Cork
Railway stations opened in 1860
Railway stations closed in 1963